Joseph Mbarga (born 7 November 1971) is a Cameroonian former professional footballer who played as a midfielder.

References

1971 births
Living people
Cameroonian footballers
Cameroon international footballers
Olympic Mvolyé players
UE Lleida players
Atlético Junior footballers
US Avranches players
Association football midfielders
Cameroonian expatriate footballers
Expatriate footballers in Spain
Cameroonian expatriate sportspeople in Spain
Expatriate footballers in Colombia
Cameroonian expatriate sportspeople in Colombia
Expatriate footballers in France
Cameroonian expatriate sportspeople in France